Brad Villavaso is a former college and high school football coach. He was an assistant coach at Ole Miss and Nicholls State University.

He also served as head coach at Vandebilt Catholic High School in Houma, Louisiana and St. John High school in Plaquemine, Louisiana.

Playing career
Villavaso played football and is an alumnus of Nicholls State University.

Coaching career
Villavaso started his coaching career at Thibodaux High School in Thibodaux, Louisiana. He then moved on to Nicholls State as outside linebackers coach from 1993 to 1995. Villavaso's first head coaching position was at St. John High School in Plaquemine, Louisiana during the 1996 season where he also served as athletic director. He then became head coach at Vandebilt Catholic High School from 1997 to 2006.

Villavaso was a graduate assistant at Ole Miss from 2007 to 2008 under coaches Ed Orgeron and Houston Nutt. He returned to Vandebilt Catholic High School as an assistant coach from 2009 to 2011 and accepted the head coaching position starting with the 2012 season. He resigned from his position as head coach on November 4, 2013.

References

External links
Nicholls State bio
Ole Miss bio

Nicholls Colonels football coaches
Nicholls Colonels football players
Ole Miss Rebels football coaches
Players of American football from Louisiana
Living people
Year of birth missing (living people)